Falls of Pattack is a waterfall in the Scottish Highlands' Cairngorm National Park. The falls are on the River Pattack, about 2 km south of the A86 road between Kinloch Laggan and Feagour.

See also
Waterfalls of Scotland

References

Waterfalls of Highland (council area)